Benin moths represent about 25 known moth species. The moths (mostly nocturnal) and butterflies (mostly diurnal) together make up the taxonomic order Lepidoptera.

This is a list of moth species which have been recorded in Benin.

Anomoeotidae
Anomoeotes infuscata Talbot, 1929

Alucitidae
Alucita chloracta (Meyrick, 1908)

Arctiidae
Amerila brunnea (Hampson, 1901)
Amerila luteibarba (Hampson, 1901)
Amerila niveivitrea (Bartel, 1903)

Cossidae
Phragmataecia psyche  (Le Cerf, 1919)

Crambidae
Pleuroptya balteata (Fabricius, 1798)

Geometridae
Zamarada vulpina Warren, 1897

Gracillariidae
Acrocercops hedymopa Turner, 1913

Noctuidae
Aegocera rectilinea Boisduval, 1836
Crameria amabilis (Drury, 1773)
Metagarista maenas (Herrich-Schäffer, 1853)
Sarothroceras banaka (Plötz, 1880)

Notodontidae
Epicerura tamsi Kiriakoff, 1963
Pseudoscrancia africana (Holland, 1893)

Saturniidae
Aurivillius horsini Bouvier, 1927
Imbrasia obscura (Butler, 1878)
Nudaurelia eblis Strecker, 1876
Nudaurelia emini (Butler, 1888)

Sesiidae
Tipulamima sexualis (Hampson, 1910)
Trichocerata bicolor (Le Cerf, 1917)

Tineidae
Cimitra fetialis (Meyrick, 1917)
Syncalipsis typhodes (Meyrick, 1917)
Tiquadra cultrifera Meyrick, 1914

Tortricidae
Rubrograptis recrudescentia Razowski, 1981
Thaumatotibia leucotreta (Meyrick, 1913)

References

External links 
 AfroMoths

Benin
Moths
Benin
Benin